KJCT may refer to:

 KJCT-LP, a low-power television station (channel 20/PSIP 8) licensed to Grand Junction, Colorado, United States
 KLML, a television station (channel 7/PSIP 20) licensed to Grand Junction, Colorado, United States, which used the call sign KJCT from 1979 to 2014